Bob Bell (21 March 1918 – 6 June 2009) was an art director who worked on the television series Thunderbirds. He died in hospital on 6 June 2009 following a prolonged illness.

References

1918 births
2009 deaths
British art directors